The George Tragos/Lou Thesz Professional Wrestling Hall of Fame is a professional wrestling hall of fame museum located within the National Wrestling Hall of Fame and Museum's Dan Gable Museum. The hall of fame honors wrestlers with a strong amateur background who have made an impact on professional wrestling. It is named after Lou Thesz, who helped create it, and his trainer George Tragos.

The hall of fame was founded in 1999 in Newton, Iowa but moved to Waterloo, Iowa in 2007. The museum suffered severe flooding in the Iowa flood of 2008, but reopened in June 2009. Wrestling historian and journalist Mike Chapman served as executive director of the museum until Kyle Klingman succeeded him in November 2009.

Inductions take place at a hall of fame induction ceremony. Other activities are held throughout the weekend in conjunction with the event, such as local independent promotion Impact Pro Wrestling's "Hall of Fame Classic" tournament in 2017 and 2018.

Honorees

Inductees

Frank Gotch Award recipients
Named after hall of fame inductee Frank Gotch, this award honors people in professional wrestling who brought positive recognition to the industry through work outside of it.

James C. Melby Award recipients
James C. Melby was the first recipient of this award and it was subsequently named after him. It recognizes excellence in professional wrestling writing or historical preservation.

Lou Thesz Award recipients
This award recognizes those in the professional wrestling industry who have used their skills in the realm of public service.

George Tragos Award recipients

This award recognizes wrestlers who have excelled in mixed martial arts.

Gordon Solie Award recipients
This award recognizes excellence in professional wrestling broadcasting.

Notes

References

External links
 Official website
 Bibliography of reports by Canoe.com

1999 establishments in Iowa
Awards established in 1999
Buildings and structures in Waterloo, Iowa
Halls of fame in Iowa
Professional wrestling halls of fame
Professional wrestling in the United States
Professional wrestling-related lists